Baranowice is a rural district (dzielnica) in the municipality of Żory since 1975, in the Silesian Voivodeship, southern Poland. Up until 1945, and between 1973–1975, it constituted an independent rural district in the historical and geographical region of Upper Silesia. Baranowice encompasses an area of 1,291 hectares and is the largest of all the districts of Żory.

History 
The rural district of Baranowitz (Baranowice) is documented as being purchased in 1436 by the Silesian nobleman Nicholaus Szassowski von Szassow, equally written as Saszowski von Saszow, and his wife Catherina for 80 Mark, who purchased the rural district from the nobleman Mikundey von Jaikowitz. Baranowitz remained a possession of the House of Saszowski estates until 1540 when it was sold on to the Osinski family, who in 1556 sold Baranowitz to Johann von Trach Brzezie in Alt-Gleiwitz.

After World War I in the Upper Silesia plebiscite 176 out of 214 voters in Baranowice voted in favour of joining Poland, against 38 opting to remain in Germany.

See also
wikimapia: Map of district Baranowice (Baranowitz)

References

Neighbourhoods in Silesian Voivodeship
Żory